The 2019–20 season was Stevenage's sixth consecutive season in League Two and their 44th year in existence. Along with competing in League Two, the club participated in the FA Cup, EFL Cup and EFL Trophy.

Following a winless start to the season, manager Dino Maamria was sacked in September 2019. First-team coach Mark Sampson assumed control of the team in a Caretaker role, overseeing the club for 14 games. With the club in 23rd-position, Graham Westley returned as manager, his fourth spell at the club. Westley resigned in February 2020 and was replaced by player Alex Revell.

The club were in last place of League Two when the season was suspended due to the COVID-19 pandemic in March 2020. EFL clubs formally agreed to end the season during an EFL meeting on 9 June 2020, although "ongoing disciplinary matters" involving 23rd-placed Macclesfield Town, who had not paid their players on six separate occasions during the season, meant Stevenage might be reprieved. Stevenage were initially relegated from League Two after an independent disciplinary panel opted to deduct Macclesfield two points on 19 June, with a further four suspended, the maximum number they could deduct without relegating them, highlighting this as a key factor in the sanctions they had chosen to impose. The EFL stated it would appeal against the independent disciplinary panel's sanctions on Macclesfield, winning their appeal against the points deduction on 11 August. This meant that the four suspended points were activated immediately and applied to the 2019–20 season, meaning Stevenage finished in 23rd-place and consequently retained their League Two status.

The season covers the period from 1 July 2019 to 30 June 2020.

Pre-season
Stevenage confirmed their pre-season schedule in June 2019.

Competitions

League Two

League table

Results summary

Results by matchday

Matches
On Thursday, 20 June 2019, the EFL League Two fixtures were revealed.

FA Cup

The first round draw was made on 21 October 2019.

EFL Cup

The first round draw was made on 20 June.

EFL Trophy

On 9 July 2019, the pre-determined group stage draw was announced with Invited clubs to be drawn on 12 July 2019. The draw for the second round was made on 16 November 2019 live on Sky Sports. The third round draw was confirmed on 5 December 2019.

Transfers

Transfers in

Loans in

Loans out

Transfers out

References

Stevenage
Stevenage F.C. seasons